Cisternino is a comune in the province of Brindisi in Apulia, on the coast of south-eastern Italy, approximately  north-west of the city of Brindisi. Its main economic activities are tourism, the growing of olives and grapes, and dairy farming.

Cisternino sits in a historic zone of Itria Valley (in Italian: Valle d'Itria), known for its prehistoric conical, dry stone houses called trulli, which are preserved under UNESCO safeguards due to their cultural significance, dry stone walls (muretti a secco), and its fertile soil which makes it the home of the Salento wine region.
In 2014, Cisternino was declared the cittaslow city of the year

Main sights
The architecture is typical of the region with an old Centro Storico (Historical Centre) containing white-washed, stone buildings with cool, shaded, cave-like interiors, narrow streets and churches. The town also features several community squares, each of which is built on the edge of the hill allowing for some spectacular landscapes.

In Cisternino and the surrounding area there have been several Bronze Age finds, including different types of hand tools. Evidence would suggest that the region was also a seasonal home to ancient hunter-gatherer humans.

Food
Broad beans purée with wild chicory (fave e cicorie selvatiche), orecchiette con braciole e polpette (a particular shape of pasta with tomato sauce, stuffed beef rolls and bread balls on the side to deep in the sauce in the end) and "bombette" (a type of roasted pork rolls) are three typical dishes of Cisternino cuisine.

Transport
Public transport in Cisternino is minimal, with a large proportion of the inhabitants relying on their own means of transport. However, there are buses to nearby Fasano which also houses the nearest major train station.

The nearest airports are in the cities of Bari and Brindisi which are both less than one hour’s drive from Cisternino.

Twin towns
 Kreuzlingen, Switzerland

Notable People
Lisetta Carmi - photographer
Una Chi - novelist, translator

References

External links 
  
 Cisternino on www.Comuni-Italiani.it
 Cisternino Tourist Association 

Cities and towns in Apulia